Isolates is a term used in developmental psychology and family studies, to describe members of a study group, usually child through young adult, who do not actively participate in cliques or friendship groups.  Isolates are one of four types of participants in friendship networks, the other three being dyads, liaisons and cliques.

Isolates may have friendly relations with members of cliques and friendship groups, but they do not associate their identity with any particular group. Isolates can be voluntarily or involuntarily isolated from peer groups, cliques or friendship groups. Isolates, overall, may experience higher levels of depression than same-age peers. Studies by Ennett and Bauman (1993), found that isolates were more prone to smoke than members of friendship groups.  A study by Henrich et al. (2000), shows isolates, male and female, have more internalizing problems than non-isolates. The study also shows female isolates have significantly lower GPAs than members of cliques.

References

Social anthropology